Ceylon  is a village in the Canadian province of Saskatchewan within the Rural Municipality of The Gap No. 39 and Census Division No. 2. It is located alongside Gibson Creek, which is a tributary of Long Creek. No shops or businesses other than the bar remain.

History 
Ceylon incorporated as a village on September 26, 1911.

Ceylon Regional Park 
The 20-acre park has a campground, ball diamonds, fishing dock, boat launch, and swimming pool. Access to the park is from Highway 377.

The dam along the river was originally built in 1934 and rebuilt in 1984. Prior to the park being designated a regional park in 1965, it was known as Ceylon Beach in the 1950s. The campground has 34 sites, showers, washrooms, and potable water. The reservoir is stocked with jackfish and perch.

Demographics 

Climate

See also

 List of communities in Saskatchewan
 Villages of Saskatchewan

References

Villages in Saskatchewan
The Gap No. 39, Saskatchewan
Division No. 2, Saskatchewan